Bohuslava Kecková (18 March 1854 – 17 October 1911) was a Bohemian physician, the first woman to earn a medical degree in what is now the Czech Republic. After completing her education at the Girl's High School of Prague, she received special permission to continue her education at the regular gymnasium and was the first woman to earn a secondary diploma. Unable to study medicine in Austria, she moved to Zürich and obtained a medical degree in 1880, becoming the first Czech woman to earn a medical certification. Though she wanted to open a medical practice in Prague, her degree was not accepted and she could not obtain permission to register on the list of doctors. Returning to school in Vienna, she completed a midwifery degree and practiced in Prague for nearly a decade. In 1892, she was selected to provide medical care to Muslim women in Bosnia and Herzegovina. After serving three years as a temporary doctor, her position was made permanent in 1896. For eighteen years, she provided medical services in the area surrounding Mostar, compiled reports and taught hygiene and health education. From 1900, she also taught health classes at the girl's high school and wrote articles on health which appeared in women's magazines in Bohemia.

Early life
Bohuslava Josefa Kecková was born on 18 March 1854 in Bukol (now a part of Vojkovice) in Bohemia, Austria-Hungary to Johanna "Jany" (née Kubičková) and Adolf Keckové. She was the middle daughter in a family composed of three girls. Her father had inherited a farm, but worked professionally in publishing. During her childhood, the farm was sold and the family moved to Karlín, near Prague, where her father had a successful construction and building firm. Kecková graduated in 1870 with the class award from the Girl's High School of Prague. Because she excelled in her studies, she received a special permit to attend and take exams from the lower gymnasium in Malá Strana and then attended the upper classes at the same school from which she matriculated on 24 July 1874. Her graduation created a sensation, as she was the first woman to earn a secondary schooling diploma in Czech lands. That same October, she enrolled in the medical faculty at the University of Zurich, because medical studies were not open to women in Bohemia, where she was joined in 1875 by fellow countrywoman, Anna Bayerová. The two women did not get along well and Bayerová left Zurich before her graduation to finish her schooling in Bern in 1881.

In her final year of studies, Kecková was appointed as an assistant in the women's clinic at the University Hospital of Zürich. She graduated on 4 August 1880, the first woman of Czech heritage to earn the title of doctor with a thesis O řezu průdušnice při nádorech na krku (The tracheal section of the throat and neck). Her plan to return to Prague, publish her dissertation and open a medical practice met strong opposition from male colleagues. Though she had been left an inheritance by her father for opening a practice, she tried for two years, using pressure from influential friends and women's groups to register on the list of doctors, but was unable to do so. Intervention by a professor at the Medical Faculty in Prague who sent her request to the Ministry of Culture and Teaching was also ignored, with claims that her certification had been received abroad and not in Austria-Hungary. Kecková's requests to be allowed to be examined at the University of Prague were also rejected. She hired a lawyer and appealed to the Supreme Court of Justice in Vienna. Based upon the fact that Austrian women were neither allowed to be students at university and thus, could not attain a doctorate, her request was rejected. Since working in her chosen field was denied unless she moved outside the country, Kecková returned to school, taking courses in gynecology and midwifery at the medical faculty of the University of Vienna.

Career
After her graduation, Kecková returned to Karlín and opened a practice as a midwife in 1883. Her practice quickly expanded, including women of all social classes and eventually she moved it to Prague. After practicing for almost a decade, in 1892, the government posted for applicants for two physician positions which had openings in Bosnia and Herzegovina. Because men were not allowed to touch Muslim women, the posts were only open to women. Of the six applicants, Kecková was appointed to serve in Mostar and Polish physician Teodora Krajewska was sent to Tuzla. She arrived on 11 January 1893 in Mostar and was officially accepted as the temporary medical officer. She successfully treated Mufti Ali Effendi Džabiči, a local Muslim leader's wife, overcoming the initial distrust of the local population and her clientele expanded. Kecková found conditions which were completely different to what she was used to. Male doctors had to diagnose medical problems without touching their female patients or examining them. Women were kept in seclusion in the harem and knew nothing of hygiene or nutrition, having no access to education.

Kecková combined treatment with health education and wrote articles which she sent back to Bohemia describing her medical rounds, which she made with two assistants and a driver, by rail, horse and finally walking to her patients. Kecková treated the sick, gave them vaccinations, and also presented educational lectures, gathering statistical information about the population. One study which required her to travel to various villages over a six-week period focused on syphilis in women. Kecková's statistical compilations included etiological data on the Bosniaks including customs, diet, housing, lifestyle, population and religious belief, as she was hoping to convey information which would diminish stereotypical prejudices and create an environment that would lead to preventive action for improved education and health.  In 1896, the position was made permanent and in 1900, she began teaching health at the Girl's High School of Mostar. Her classes included instruction on anatomy and practical nursing. She taught and submitted articles in Croatian. Her articles appeared in Bohemian newspapers like Ženských listů (Women's Leaves) and Lada (Lady) on such topics as drinking, nutrition and tuberculosis from 1897 to 1910.

Death and legacy
As she aged, Kecková had a series of health problems related to diabetes and made frequent trips to Karlovy Vary for recuperation. On one such trip, she cut her trip short and went to visit her sister in Kostomlaty nad Labem, where she died on 17 October 1911.

References

Citations

Bibliography

1854 births
1911 deaths
People from Mělník District
University of Zurich alumni
University of Vienna alumni
Bohemian women
Czech midwives
Austro-Hungarian physicians in Bosnia and Herzegovina
19th-century women writers
19th-century Czech physicians
19th-century women physicians